Lee Hall or Lee Hall Mansion is a historic brick plantation house that was built during the period from 1848 to 1859.  The community of Lee Hall, Virginia is named for it.  The house and village are located near the junction of U.S. 60 and VA 238, in Newport News, Virginia.

The current  property was listed on the National Register of Historic Places in 1972.  The listed property includes two contributing buildings: The Main House (open to the public) and the former Kitchen (closed to public, used as staff offices).

The house as well as the nearby community of Lee Hall were named for Richard Decatur Lee the original owner and builder of Lee Hall Mansion. Lee was a prominent local planter.  Despite having the same last name as Virginia native and Confederate general Robert E. Lee, a direct lineage to General Lee cannot be traced. Lee Hall Mansion was used as headquarters for Confederate generals Joseph E. Johnston and John B. Magruder during the Peninsula Campaign of the American Civil War in 1862. Nearby is Endview Plantation, a 238-year-old house. Endview was used as a hospital during the Civil War and as a campground during the Revolutionary War, the War of 1812 and the Civil War.

References

External links

 Lee Hall Mansion - official site

Plantation houses in Virginia
Houses on the National Register of Historic Places in Virginia
Houses completed in 1859
Houses in Newport News, Virginia
Museums in Newport News, Virginia
Historic house museums in Virginia
National Register of Historic Places in Newport News, Virginia